Alfred Macorig (8 December 1921 – 21 December 1996) was an Italian-French racing cyclist. He rode in the 1947 and 1948 Tour de France.

References

External links
 

1921 births
1996 deaths
French male cyclists
Italian male cyclists
Italian emigrants to France
Cyclists from Friuli Venezia Giulia